Kristina Ovchinnikova (born 21 March 2001) is a Kazakhstani athlete. She competed in the women's high jump event at the 2020 Summer Olympics.

International competitions

References

External links
 

2001 births
Living people
Kazakhstani female high jumpers
Athletes (track and field) at the 2020 Summer Olympics
Olympic athletes of Kazakhstan
Sportspeople from Almaty
Islamic Solidarity Games medalists in athletics